Political dynasties in the Philippines are typically characterized as families that have established their political or economic dominance in a province and have coordinated efforts to move on to involvement in national government or other positions. Political dynasties usually have a strong, consolidated support base concentrated around the province in which they are dominant. Members of such dynasties usually do not limit their involvement to political activities, and may participate in business or cultural activities.

Notable Philippine political dynasties include the Marcos, Aquino, Binay, Macapagal, Duterte, and Roxas families. There has been a lot of debate regarding the effects political dynasties have on the political and economic status of Philippine society. Despite the negative reaction of the populace towards political dynasties and the association between dynastic activities and corruption, it is only prohibited in the members of the youth-oriented Sangguniang Kabataan.

History 
Political dynasties have long been a feature of the Philippine political landscape. Political dynasties started emerging after the Philippine Revolution when the First Republic of the Philippines was established. With the decline of Spain's economic power and international prestige in the 19th century, the expansion of British and American influence around the world, and the political current of emergent nationalism among the children of the economically enfranchised bourgeois, the power of the peninsulares', or Spanish-born aristocracy declined propitiously. Following the defeat of the Spanish in the Spanish–American War, the surviving members of the Spanish or Spanish-sanctioned landholding elite and the newly ascendant merchant elite, who were mostly foreign expatriates or of Chinese origin, formed a de facto aristocracy to replace the power vacuum the Spanish had left.

Aristocracy survived and prospered under the American colonial regime, and remained a permanent fixture in Philippine society even following the independence of the Philippines was finally confirmed following the devastation of the Philippines under the Japanese occupation of the Philippines during World War II. Over the years, political dynasties continued to adapt, as newer dynasties emerged to fill power vacuums left behind by the extinction of older dynasties. The majority of the available positions in Philippine government are currently held by members of these political dynasties.

Philippine laws 
The 1987 Constitution of the Philippines states in Article II Section 26: "The State shall guarantee equal access to opportunities for public service, and prohibit political dynasties as may be defined by law." According to the Philippine Institute for Development Studies, placing limits on political dynasties aims "to regulate self-serving and opportunistic behavior and to promote effective and accountable governance".

Despite the provision in the Constitution, the Sangguniang Kabataan Reform Act of 2016 is the only statute that has been implemented concerning the status of political dynasties in the Philippines. The closest explicit mention of political dynasties in Philippine law can be seen in Republic Act 7160 or the Local Government Code, where Book I, Title Two, Chapter 1, Section 43 states the term limit of local government officials. However, it does not include any limitations on the running of the incumbent's family relations or on the holding of multiple political positions by members of the same family.

In 2016, the Sangguniang Kabataan Reform Law (Republic Act No. 10742) was signed into law, which made some significant changes to the Sangguniang Kabataan (SK). It changed the age of the council from 15 to 17 years old to 18 to 24 years old and it forbids individuals from seeking a youth council appointment who is closer than the second degree of consanguinity (have the same grandparents) from any elected or appointed official in the same area.

It is the first Philippine law with an anti-political dynasty restriction for elected positions, as stipulated by the 1987 Philippine Constitution.

Proposed legislation 
Several bills have been filed in relation to the prohibition of political dynasties, and are currently pending to be approved by the Congress. Many have called for Congress to pass the Anti-Dynasty Law, but this bill has been passed over by each Congress since 1987.

On January 24, 2011, Senator Miriam Defensor Santiago filed Senate Bill 2649, which prohibits political dynasties from holding or running for elected local government positions. The bill disqualifies the following candidates from running for local government positions:
 relatives of an incumbent elected official running for re-election up to the second degree of consanguinity, and are planning to run in the same province in the same election as the elected official
 relatives of an incumbent elected official that holds a national position up to the second degree of consanguinity, and are planning to run in the province of origin of the elected official
 persons that are not relatives of an elected official that are candidates to the same position in the same province in the same election but are related to each other up to the second degree of consanguinity.
The bill also prohibits relatives within the prohibited civil degree of relationship of an incumbent from succeeding to the incumbent's position, except for the positions of Punong Barangay and Sangguniang Barangay.

Three bills were filed in the House of Representatives that are similar in content to Senate Bill 2649:
 House Bill 172 filed on July 1, 2013, by representatives under the Bayan Muna, Gabriela, ACT, Anakpawis and Kabataan partylists 
 House Bill 837 filed on July 2, 2013, by Representative Erlinda Santiago of the 1-SAGIP party list
 House Bill 2911 filed on September 18, 2013, by Representative Oscar Rodriguez from the 3rd district of Pampanga

On December 16, 2013, the House of Representatives Committee on Suffrage and Electoral Reforms agreed to replace the three House bills into a single bill filed as House Bill 3587. The bill sought to limit the number of candidates from the same political clan from running for public office in a given period. The bill would give "the best and brightest from a disadvantaged family equal access to public service which otherwise could have been held and occupied by other members of political dynasties", said Representative Fredenil Castro of the electoral reform committee.

In 2016, House Speaker and Quezon City representative Feliciano Belmonte Jr. filed House Bill 166 titled "Anti-political dynasty Act" seeking to prohibit the proliferation of political clans in the Philippines.

Statistics 
Due to the increasing number of political dynasties in the Philippines, majority of the positions in government are held by politicians that are members of political dynasties. In fact, in the years 1995–2007, an average of 31.3% of all congressmen and 23.1% of governors were replaced by relatives. In the 1995 elections, of the 83 congressmen elected on to their third term, 36 of them were replaced by a relative in the succeeding elections. The term "relative" here referring to anyone with a familial connection such as a wife, a son or daughter, a cousin, etc. In many of these cases, the people who would eventually go on to take their place had no previous political background or experience save their familial connection.

In a study done in 2012 by economists Beja, Mendoza, Venida, and Yap, it was estimated that 40% of all provinces in the Philippines have a provincial governor and congressman that are related in some way. Another 2014 study done by Querubin of the Department of Politics in New York University indicated that an estimate 50–70% of all politicians are involved or associated in a political dynasty within the Philippines, including local government units. In the same study, it was concluded that approximately 70% of all jurisdiction-based legislators in the current Congress are involved in a political dynasty, with 40% of them having ties to legislators who belonged to as far as 3 Congresses prior. It is also said that 77% of legislators between the ages of 26–40 are also dynastic, which indicates that the second and third generations of political dynasties in the Philippines have begun their political careers as well.

To analyze patterns of political dynasties within the 15th Congress, categories were formed according to the number of familial ties each politician had to politicians belonging to previous Congresses:

 Category 1: Those with ties to the 12th, 13th, 14th and 15th Congress as well as at least one family member elected into a local government unit between the years 2001 and 2010
 Category 2: Those with familial connections to at least one person belonging to the 12th, 13th, or 14th Congress
 Category 3: Those who share kinship with at least one person belonging to the 12th, 13th, or 14th dynasty, or at least one relative with a local government unit (LGU) position from the 2001, 2004, or 2007 elections
 Category 4: Those with at least one relation in the 12th, 13th, or 14th Congress or holding a local government unit (LGU) position in the elections in between 2001 and 2010

In a population of 229 legislators in the 15th Congress, 155 of them are classified as belonging to the fourth category. Of those 155, 144 of them also belong to the third category. 84 of the 144 belong in the second category, and of the 84, 10 belong to the first category.

Poverty 
The 10 poorest provinces in the Philippines are ruled by political dynasties. According to one study, these provinces "are afflicted by low levels of human development, bad governance, violence and poor business climates". Research suggests that either poverty results in the creation of political dynasty or that these dynasties exacerbate bad governance and worsen poverty conditions. Although the study found a correlation, this does not determine whether it is a causal relationship since poverty is multifaceted.

The study used empirical data that correlated political dynasty presence with socio-economic development. This study stated that "this partial correlation coefficient finds a positive relationship between poverty incidence and the proportion of political dynasties in each province."

Corruption 
Political dynasties have been blamed for worsening corruption in the Philippines. According to the Catholic Bishops’ Conference of the Philippines, "political dynasties breed corruption and ineptitude" because political power is monopolized by political dynasties.

The dominance of powerful families have also allowed politicians facing corruption charges to get elected into public office.

Critical reception 
Various writers wrote articles that analyze and critique politicians that fall under the domain of a political dynasty. Often, these articles hold these said persons and families in a critical light. Although political dynasties have already been present in the Philippines for a significant period of time, the public has only recently started clamoring for a change in system. The public support for the bill against political dynasties has steadily increased because the president, while part of a dynasty himself, fully supports the passage of the Anti-Dynasty Bill.

On a provincial scale, political dynasties are often held in higher regard- contrasted with dynasties that oversee a wider public, where reception is mostly negative.

Negative 
Political dynasties limit political competition, exacerbating corruption, poverty, and abuse of power.

One notable theory concerning the negative effects of political dynasties is a political "Carnegie effect", named after Andrew Carnegie. The "Carnegie effect" is based on Carnegie's decision to give all his wealth to non-family members, where he argues that his son might have less incentive of working hard if he were to be assured of his father's wealth. This idea of inherited wealth and connections discouraging future generations to work hard can also be attributed to dynastic politicians. Dynastic politicians have a significant advantage from the start of their political career as they have a statistically higher probability, likely due to factors such as popularity and incumbency advantage, to win elections when pitted against politicians with no such political networks. Dynastic politicians also have generally lower educational attainment, because of their reliance on dynastic connections rather than bureaucratic or academic competence for their position.

There is also significant evidence to suggest that Philippine political dynasties use their political dominance over their respective regions to enrich themselves, using methods such as graft or outright bribery of legislators. These kinds of situations arise as conflicts of interests—political dynasties often hold significant economic power in a province—and their interests are overrepresented due to dynastic politics.

Political dynasties also tend to maintain the status quo and develop interests largely separate from the people they were supposed to be serving. Dynastic candidates, being almost exclusively from the upper classes, are naturally biased towards defending their own vested economic interests, which presents conflict of interest problems. Political dynasties also prevent challengers with potentially effective policy ideas from being able to take office, which limits the capacity for bureaucratic responsiveness and administrative effectiveness and adaptation to new ideas.

Positive 
According to one theory, political dynasties have extra incentive to develop their own jurisdictions. Based on Mancur Olson's theory of political governance or the "Roving Bandits vs. Stationary Bandits" theory, dynastic politicians are more likely to pursue long-term development-oriented strategies since they expect to hold power and benefit from their position for longer. This is usually set in contrast to non-dynastic politicians who would, under this theory, have less incentive to develop due to their limited term. Political dynasties can gain benefits either directly or indirectly through their relatives. Political dynasties are responsible for the increase in women's political participation in politics. Female politicians hailing from political dynasties can easily get into politics due to their connections. Political dynasties have the advantage of continuity. The more control the family has over the government unit, the more members of the family can occupy positions of power. Political dynasties can theoretically use this continuity by promoting and enacting laws and ordinances that are long-term in nature; with only a slim chance of other candidates outside of the dynasty interfering with the plans.

Philippine political families

Ampatuan 
The Ampatuan family has exercised political crowd control over the Maguindanao region since, 2001, with several of its members holding positions in government. The family's patriarch, Andal Ampatuan Sr., was elected Governor of Maguindanao in 2001. His sons, Andal Ampatuan Jr. and Zaldy Ampatuan, were the former mayor of Datu Unsay and former governor of ARMM respectively. 80 members of the Ampatuan family ran for governmental positions during the 2013 elections. The Ampatuans' rise to power is attributed to support received from President Gloria Macapagal Arroyo. As a result of their connection, the Ampatuans won Arroyo a large majority of votes from Maguindanao during the 2004 presidential elections. The Arroyo administration's issuance of Executive Order 546 then allowed the Ampatuans to form their own private army, also known as civilian volunteer organizations.

Despite their prominence in Maguindanao, the Ampatuans were generally unheard of outside of the region until the infamous 2009 Maguindanao massacre. They were charged and sentenced for their involvement in the massacre that killed 57 people. The victims had been on their way to file the candidacy of Esmael "Toto" Mangudadatu for the 2010 elections when they were stopped by an armed convoy. They were later abducted and murdered; some victims were also reported to have been raped. After the discovery of the mass graves, President Arroyo declared martial law in Maguindanao. 198 people, including Andal Ampatuan Sr. and Andal Ampatuan Jr., were charged with murder. Charges against some of the suspects were later dropped. Andal Ampatuan Sr., suspected to be the mastermind behind the massacre, died on July 17, 2015.

Brothers Datu Andal Jr., Zaldy, and Anwar Ampatuan Sr. were convicted of 57 counts of murder and sentenced to life imprisonment without parole on December 19, 2019. A total of 28 people, including other Ampatuan clan members and police officers were sentenced to life imprisonment.

Aquino 

The Aquinos are a political family that originated from Tarlac. The dynasty began with Servillano Aquino, a general during the Philippine Revolution and delegate of the Malolos Congress. His son, Benigno Aquino Sr., was a speaker in the House of Representatives during the Japanese-sponsored Second Philippine Republic. He was charged and arrested for collaborating with the Japanese during World War II. The most prominent member of the family, Benigno Aquino Jr., was a leading figure in the opposition against the Marcos regime. He would be assassinated on the tarmac in the Manila International Airport.. After his death, his wife, Corazon Aquino became active in politics, becoming a key figure during the People Power Revolution. She later became the first female president of the Philippines after Ferdinand Marcos has been exiled in 1986. And her term was well known because of the Human Rights Abuse on Mendiola massacre, and because of the well-known 6 Coup d'etat attempts during her term. Her death in 2009 garnered widespread public support reminiscent of her husband's. This would also result in support for Benigno Aquino III's candidacy for president; he ultimately became the country's 15th president.

Other prominent members of the family include the first cousin of Aquino III, Bam Aquino, who served as senator from 2013 to 2019. Other politicians from the Aquino family with a direct lineage to Sevillano Aquino include Butz Aquino who was a senator from 1987 to 1995, and Tessie Aquino who was a senator from 1995 to 2004.

Binay 
The Binay political family started with Jejomar "Jojo" Cabauatan Binay, a human rights lawyer who represented political prisoners for free in the 70's during the Martial Law period of President Ferdinand E. Marcos. When Corazon "Cory" Aquino with People's Power toppled Marcos, she appointed Jojo Binay as acting mayor of Makati in 1986. After a year, he was appointed as acting governor of Metro Manila. In 1988, he was elected for his first official term as mayor of Makati City and served three terms successively. After three years break, he was elected again as mayor and served for another three terms until 2010 when he became the 13th Vice President of the Philippines under Benigno "Noynoy" Aquino III. He ran for the presidency but lost his bid to President Rodrigo Duterte in the 2016 Elections. Recently, he filed his senatorial candidacy in the forthcoming 2022 Elections.

Among his five children, three of them joined him in politics as well which basically alternates each other in the mayorship of Makati City and most likely in the senate too should Jojo Binay succeeds in his senatorial bid in the forthcoming 2022 Elections. The eldest, Nancy Binay, is the incumbent senator. She was first elected in 2013 and landed 5th among 12 elected senators despite of her having no prior government experience. She was reelected in 2019 for her second term as senator. Another daughter Abigail Binay, a lawyer, is the incumbent mayor of Makati City. Abigail was previously elected as congressional representative of the 2nd district of Makati City in 2007 and served for three terms until her election as mayor. While his only son Jejomar Binay Jr. has also served as mayor of Makati City when he was elected in 2010 but during the last year of his second term he was unseated by the Ombudsman of the Philippines. He is perpetually banned from holding any public office after the Court of Appeals affirmed the charges of grave misconduct, dishonesty and conduct prejudicial to the best interest of the service over the construction of a Makati school building on May 28, 2019. The mayorship of Makati City has been held by the Binays for 33 years since 1988.

Duterte
The Duterte political family began with Vicente "Nene" Gonzales Duterte, a lawyer and former mayor of Danao, Cebu in 1945 until 1946, who migrated with his family to Davao to practice law and became a governor of the then-unified province of Davao in 1959 until 1965 when President Ferdinand Marcos Sr. appointed him as Secretary of General Services which position he held until his death in 1968. Although Davao became a stronghold of the Dutertes, his hometown Danao remains a bailiwick of the Duterte clan whose family members took turns dominating Danao's local politics. While his nephew Ronald Regis Duterte, also a lawyer, was a member of the legislative council of Cebu City for 17 years since 1963 with three consecutive terms  before becoming its vice mayor in 1980 and ultimately as mayor in 1983. Ronald became the president of the then University of Southern Philippines (USP) in 1991 and later on as dean of its college of law.

His son Rodrigo "Digong" Duterte, also a lawyer, who followed his political footsteps in Davao, became the 16th President of the Philippines after winning in the 2016 presidential election. Before becoming president, he was a mayor of Davao City for 22 years serving for seven terms. At 71, he is the oldest person to assume the presidency and the first to hail from Mindanao.

Other prominent members of the Duterte family include Rodrigo's children: Sara Duterte, Paolo Duterte, and Sebastian Duterte. Sara Duterte is now serving as the 15th Vice President of Philippines after being successfully elected in May 2022 in tandem with Bongbong Marcos who won the presidency by landslide votes. Prior to becoming the vice president, Sara Duterte was the mayor of Davao City having taken it over for the second time from her father when the latter ran for the presidency in 2016. She previously held the mayorship in 2010 replacing her father who at the time on his third term and likewise served as vice mayor to his father in 2007. While Paolo Duterte is the incumbent Davao City 1st District Representative since 2019 and former Deputy Speaker of the House for Political Affairs. Paolo Duterte previously served as his father's vice mayor in 2013 and later as her sister's vice mayor in 2018. Sebastian Duterte, who ran unopposed, replaced Paolo as vice mayor in 2019 and ultimately replaced Sara as mayor in May 2022 elections. The mayorship of Davao City has been held continuously by the Dutertes since 1988 except for one term in 1998 until 2001 where Rodrigo was succeeded at the end of his third term by his vice mayor Benjamin de Guzman.

Estrada 
The Estrada political family began with Joseph "Erap" Ejercito Estrada, who began as a successful film actor. The popularity Estrada gained from acting would prove to be valuable when he pursued a career in politics. He served as the mayor of San Juan from 1969 to 1986, senator from 1987 to 1992, and vice president from 1992 to 1998. He later succeeded Fidel Ramos to be the 13th President of the Philippines. During his term, Estrada's wife and First Lady, Loi Estrada, served as senator. Allegations of corruption under his administration led to an impeachment trial, which was discontinued after the court voted against opening an envelope possibly containing incriminating evidence. This resulted in the four-day-long Second People Power Revolution. His resignation from presidency was declared soon afterwards. Despite this, the absolute pardon given by former President Arroyo allowed Estrada to run for and eventually became the mayor of Manila in 2013. Estrada ran and won his second term as mayor in 2016 but lost his bid for the third term in 2019. Estrada retired from politics since then, although he continues to lead his party, Pwersa ng Masang Pilipino.

Many other members of the Estrada family are still active in politics, particularly in San Juan. Among these are his sons, Jinggoy Estrada and JV Ejercito, who both served as Mayor of San Juan and Senator. JV's mother, Guia Guanzon Gomez, was the 18th Mayor of San Juan who served for three terms. Jinggoy is currently facing plunder charges before the Sandiganbayan anti-graft court over his involvement in a multibillion peso pork barrel scam. He was arrested and detained in 2014, and released on bail in 2017. Both Jinggoy Estrada and JV Ejercito ran unsuccessfully for the senate in 2019, and ran again in 2022 but this time winning the 12th and 10th place respectively.

Marcos 

The Marcoses are one of the most well-known political families in the Philippines. The dynasty started with Mariano Marcos, a lawyer from Ilocos Norte who was a member of the House of Representatives back in 1925. The Solid North, and particularly Ilocos Norte, remains to be the Marcoses’ political stronghold today. The Marcoses currently cannot set foot in any United States territory because of a contempt judgement.

The family was at its peak during the presidency of Ferdinand E. Marcos, from 1965 until 1986, son of Mariano Marcos. Marcos's family members also held several governmental positions during this period. Though they were exiled as a result of the People Power Revolution, the Marcos family has since regained power and is currently active in Philippine politics. Imelda Marcos, wife of Ferdinand and former first lady, was a representative of the second district of Ilocos Norte. Marcos’ daughter, Imee Marcos, is an incumbent senator, having been elected in 2019. She was previously the governor of Ilocos Norte. Marcos' only son, Bongbong Marcos, a former senator, governor of Ilocos Norte, and second district representative of Ilocos Norte, ran unsuccessfully for the vice presidency in the 2016 vice presidential race. He is the 17th President of the Philippines after winning the 2022 Philippine Presidential Election, receiving 31 million votes.

Ortega
The Ortega political clan is believed to be the Philippines' political family with the longest unbroken political rule, ruling over the province of La Union for over a century. The current progenitor of the Ortega political dynasty is former governor Manuel "Manoling" Ortega, who served as Governor of the province from 2007 to 2016.

Roxas
The Roxas political family started with Manuel Acuña Roxas, the fifth president of the Philippines. Before being president, he served as the governor of Capiz (now named Roxas City). As a descendant of Antonia Róxas y Ureta, he is also related to the Zobel de Ayalas, a prominent business family. His son, Gerardo Roxas, served as a representative of the 1st District of Capiz and senator. His grandson, Gerardo Roxas Jr. served as a representative of the 1st District of Capiz in 1987until his death in 1993. He was succeeded by his elder brother, Manuel "Mar" Araneta Roxas II, who was elected in 1993 and later accepted the appointment as Secretary of Trade and Industry in 2000 under the Estrada administration. Mar Roxas ran successfully as senator in 2004 but was unsuccessful in his bid for the vice presidency in 2010. He was appointed as Secretary of Transportation and Communications in 2011 and Secretary of the Interior and Local Government in 2012 under the administration of President Benigno Aquino III. In 2016, he ran for the presidency, in which he lost to then mayor Rodrigo Duterte, ranking second. In 2019, he ran for senator but failed to secure a seat, placing 16th in the elections.

See also 
Political family
Hereditary politicians
List of political families in the Philippines

References 

Political families of the Philippines
Oligarchy
Social inequality
Political history of the Philippines